The following is a list of events and releases that happened in 2021 in African music.

Events
14 March – At the 63rd Annual Grammy Awards, Nigerian musician Burna Boy wins the Grammy Award for Best Global Music Album and is among the live performers.
18 June – South African soprano Masabane Cecilia Rangwanasha wins the Song Prize at the BBC Cardiff Singer of the World competition.
9 August – In recognition of South African Women's Day, Apple Music launches the third part of its Visionary Women campaign, celebrating female artists such as Makhadzi.
October – CKay's "Love Nwantiti" becomes the most-watched music video on YouTube, the first song from Africa to achieve this. 
14 November – The 8th African Muzik Magazine Awards takes place in Dallas, Texas.

Albums released in 2021

Deaths
January 8 – Dorine Mokha, 31, Congolese dancer and choreographer (malaria)
January 22 – Guem, 73, Algerian singer, composer and dancer.
January 23 
Jonas Gwangwa, 83, South African jazz musician
Ahmed Achour, 75, Tunisian composer and conductor
January 28 – Sibongile Khumalo, 63, South African singer
January 31 – Wambali Mkandawire (Mtebeti Wambali Mkandawire), 68, Malawian jazz singer and activist.
February 5 – Abdoul Jabbar, 40–41, Guinean singer-songwriter
February 16 – Soul Jah Love, 31, Zimbabwean reggae/Zimdancehall musician (complications from diabetes)
March 7 – Josky Kiambukuta, 72, Congolese singer (TPOK Jazz).
March 14 – Thione Seck, 66, Senegalese mbalakh singer and musician
April 5 – Haja El Hamdaouia, 91, Moroccan singer and songwriter, known for Chaabi and Aita
April 18 – Naïma Ababsa, 51, Algerian singer
April 27 – Sammy Kasule, 69, Ugandan musician and singer
May 7 – Jamal Salameh, 75, Egyptian songwriter and composer
June 21 – Mamady Keïta, 70, Guinean drummer
June 22 – Mzilikazi Khumalo, 89, South African composer and academic
June 25 – Wes Madiko, 57, Cameroonian singer
July 1 – Steve Kekana, 63, South African singer
July 11 – Sound Sultan (Olanrewaju Abdul-Ganiu Fasasi), 44, Nigerian rapper and hip hop pioneer (angioimmunoblastic T-cell lymphoma)
August 3 – Allan Stephenson, 71, British-born South African cellist, conductor and composer
August 9 (killed in car crash)
Khanya "The Voice" Hadebe, 20s, South African amapiano musician
Killer Kau, 23, South African amapiano musician
Mpura, 20s South African amapiano musician
August 28 – Victor Uwaifo, 80, Nigerian ogbonge musician and cultural figure
August 31 – Nobesuthu Mbadu, 76, South African mbaqanga singer
September 2 – Alemayehu Eshete, 80, Ethiopian singer
September 28 – Nana Ampadu, 76, Ghanaian musician
October 3 – Anouman Brou Félix, 86, Ivorian Akyé musician 
October 8 – Rabah Driassa, 87, Algerian artist and folk singer
November 7 – Bopol Mansiamina, 72, Congolese guitarist, vocalist, composer, and producer
November 17 – Theuns Jordaan, 50, South African singer-songwriter (leukaemia)
December 27 – Defao, 62, Congolese singer-songwriter, COVID-19.

See also 
 2021 in music

References 

Africa
African music
2021 in Africa